is an anime art director in Japan.

Projects
All credits are for art director unless otherwise noted.
 Atashin'chi 
 Esper Mami
 Hamtaro (TV series and movies)
 High School! Kimengumi (TV series and movie)
 Hare Tokidoki Buta
 Oishinbo (episodes 27-28 were special selections of the 27th Galaxy Award)
 Ultraman USA

Sources:

References

External links
 
  Japan Movie Database

Japanese art directors
Japanese animators
Year of birth missing (living people)
Living people